Cazaril-Tambourès is a village and a commune in the Haute-Garonne department in southwestern France. The commune had in 2013 census, a population of 87. At the 2019 census the population remained less than 100, with 84 people.

Population

See also
Communes of the Haute-Garonne department

References

Communes of Haute-Garonne